Kuchpanqa (Quechua kuchpay to roll, -nqa an archaic nominalising suffix to indicate a place destinated for something, "(place) for rolling something", hispanicized spelling Cuchpanga) is a mountain at a small lake of that name in the Andes of Peru, about  high.

References

Mountains of Peru
Mountains of Pasco Region